The Children's Book of the Year Award: Eve Pownall Award for Information Books was first presented in 1988, when the award was financed by Eve Pownall's family.  Since 1993 it has been awarded annually by the Children's Book Council of Australia (CBCA).

The Award "will be made to outstanding books which have the prime intention of documenting factual material with consideration given to imaginative presentation, interpretation and variation of style.  As general guidelines, the judges may consider the relative success of the book in balancing and harmonising the following elements:
 style of language and presentation;
 graphic excellence;
 clarity, appropriateness and aesthetic appeal of illustration;
 integration of text, graphics and illustration to engage interest and enhance understanding;
 overall design of the book to facilitate the presentation of information;
 accuracy with regard to the current state of knowledge."

Award winners

1980s

1990s

2000s

2010s

2020s

See also 

 List of CBCA Awards
 List of Australian literary awards

External links
 CBCA Awards History

References

Awards established in 1988
Children's Book Council of Australia
1988 establishments in Australia
English-language literary awards
Children's literary awards